(5335) Damocles , provisional designation , is a centaur and the namesake of the damocloids, a group of minor planets which may be inactive nuclei of the Halley-type and long-period comets. It was discovered on 18 February 1991, by Australian astronomer Robert McNaught at Siding Spring Observatory in Australia. It is named after Damocles, a figure of Greek mythology.

Description 
When Damocles was discovered, it was found to be on an orbit completely different from all others known. Damocless orbit reached from inside the aphelion of Mars to as far as Uranus. It seemed to be in transition from a near-circular outer Solar System orbit to an eccentric orbit taking it to the inner Solar System. Duncan Steel, Gerhard Hahn, Mark Bailey, and David Asher carried out projections of its long-term dynamical evolution, and found a good probability that it will become an Earth-crosser asteroid, and may spend a quarter of its life in such an orbit. Damocles has a stable orbit for tens of thousands of years before and after the present, because its highly inclined orbit does not take it near Jupiter or Saturn.

There is some speculation that Damocles may have a meteor shower associated with it on Mars from the direction of Draco.

, Damocles is 19.6 AU from the Sun with an apparent magnitude of 26.3 . It reached its furthest point from the Sun in 2011.

The adjectival form is Damoclean, . The official naming citation was published by the Minor Planet Center on 1 September 1993.

See also
 The sword of Damocles – an over-hanging threat, a long-standing political metaphor from ancient Greece.

References

External links 
 
 
 
 
 
 
 

Centaurs (small Solar System bodies)
005335
005335
Discoveries by Robert H. McNaught
Named minor planets
005335
19910218